The Race Card: Campaign Strategy, Implicit Messages, and the Norm of Equality, is a book written by American author Tali Mendelberg. In this book, she examines how and when politicians play the race card and then manage to plausibly deny doing so. She argues that politicians routinely evoke racial stereotypes, fears, and resentments without voters' awareness. The book argues that politicians sometimes resort to subtle uses of race to win elections.

Awards
 2002: Woodrow Wilson Foundation Award, American Political Science Association

Samples of the text
 Sample 1
 Sample 2
 Sample 3

Reviews
 Princeton review
 Powells review

References

2001 books
Books about politics of the United States